George Oliver may refer to:

George Oliver (footballer) (1883–1964), Australian footballer
George Oliver (freemason) (1782–1867), English cleric, schoolmaster, topographer and writer on Freemasonry
George Oliver (golfer) (1883–1965), American Olympic golfer
George Oliver (historian) (1781–1861), Roman Catholic priest and historian
George Oliver (physician) (1841–1915), English physician
George Oliver (politician) (1888–1984), British politician
George Oliver (rugby) (1891–1977), dual-code international rugby union and rugby league footballer of the 1910s and 1920s 
George K. Oliver, American polo player
George T. Oliver (1848–1917), U.S. Senator from Pennsylvania
 George Oliver Onions (1873–1961), British writer better known as Oliver Onions
George Oliver, chairman and CEO of Johnson Controls

See also